K. Marulasiddappa is an exponent of drama and a writer in the Kannada language. A resident of the state of Karnataka in India, he was also the former chairman of the Karnataka Nataka Academy which is an institution formed to encourage the growth of theatre in Karnataka.

Books
 Satpadi sahitya (Samanyanige sahitya charitre) (1975)
 Kannada nataka samikshe (1986)
 Kannada nataka vimarse (Kannada Adhyayana Kendra Male)(1978)

References

Kannada-language writers
Living people
Recipients of the Rajyotsava Award 2003
Year of birth missing (living people)